This is a list of Maldivian films released in 1998.

Releases

Feature film

Television 
This is a list of Maldivian series, in which the first episode was aired or streamed in 1998.

See also
 Lists of Maldivian films

References 

Maldivian
1998